The  (Voss's Newspaper) was a nationally known Berlin newspaper that represented the interests of the liberal middle class. It was also generally regarded as Germany's national newspaper of record. In the Berlin press it held a special role due to the fact that by way of its direct predecessors it was the oldest newspaper in the city. The name went back to Christian Friedrich Voss, who was its owner from 1751 to 1795, but  became its official name only after 1911. It ceased publication in 1934 under pressure from the Nazi state.

Beginnings in Berlin

In the early 17th century Christoff Frischmann collected and passed on to interested parties the news he received as postmaster of the Electorate of Brandenburg. Over time he systematized his news gathering, and he was ultimately given a mandate to maintain contacts throughout the "Holy Roman Empire of the German Nation" and to collect news from all important locations. His first printed newspapers came out in 1617 and appeared weekly, although not always regularly.

As early as 1618 copies regularly included correspondence from major cities in Western Europe. Censors often interfered with the reporting, especially because the paper's pro-Protestant stance during the Thirty Years' War prompted the Catholic Imperial Court in Vienna to demand that the Elector of Brandenburg take action against it. As a result, the paper could not appear for a time. Worn down by the constant worry about the continued existence of his newspaper, Veit Frischmann in 1655 left the concession to his printer Christoph Runge, who gave the paper a new title in 1658:  (Berlin Incoming General and Postal Newspapers). In 1704 the book printer Johann Lorentz acquired the newspaper from Runge's widow, and his privilege was promptly confirmed by King Frederick I of Prussia.

The paper itself celebrated its 200th anniversary in 1904 and cited the corresponding year on its front page. The newspaper's age is most often based on its (almost) uninterrupted existence since 1617.

Contested monopoly 

Crown Prince Frederick, later King Frederick II (Frederick the Great), found the newspaper uninteresting. Because his father, King Frederick William I, had decreed that no expressions of opinion, and certainly no critical ones, could be printed, the paper contained only trivial news items, mainly about festivities at court, receptions, criminal cases and executions. Nor did the lack of competition provide any inducement to improve the journalistic quality of the paper. But on the second day after his accession to the throne in 1740, Frederick II commissioned his bookseller Ambrosius Haude to publish two new newspapers in Berlin, one in German, the second, which lasted only a year, in French.

On the question of press censorship, the king had expressed the opinion early on that "gazettes, if they are to be interesting, must not be censored". In 1742 censorship was abolished but used again during the first Silesian Wars and formally reintroduced in 1749, although with a royal mandate to keep interference in press freedom as low as possible under wartime conditions. Berlin's papers enjoyed greater freedom at that time than newspapers of other German states and were able to spread almost unhindered the ideas of the Enlightenment, to which Frederick II was committed.

From Voss to Ullstein 

After Johann Rüdiger died in 1751 without a male heir, his son-in-law, the bookseller Christian Friedrich Voss, took over the newspaper. It was published three times a week and contained four pages. Just 150–200 copies per issue were printed, and it was sold only in bookstores. This originally referred to Voss's daughter Marie Friederike, who was married to Karl Gotthelf Lessing, a brother of the poet Gotthold Ephraim Lessing. She had taken over the newspaper after a lengthy legal dispute in 1801 and thus brought it into the possession of the Lessing family (Carl Robert Lessing), who continued the business.

By about 1800 the newspaper had expanded to 16 pages, and in 1802 added business and advertising sections which were positively received.  Even though it had become more comprehensive and varied, it remained journalistically quite superficial due to the again strict censorship which did not allow criticism of the principles of religion, the state, or public order. During the Napoleonic Wars, the editors of the newspaper – as well as King Frederick William III – fled to Breslau in Silesia. After returning to Berlin, it went on to be published daily between 1824 and 1875, and after that twice a day.

The paper represented the interests of the liberal middle classes. Beginning in 1843 it campaigned for the abolition of press censorship and was unambiguously on the side of the liberal forces in the 1848 revolution. The entire editorial staff attended the funeral of the 'March Fallen', the 183 civilian victims who died in Berlin on 18 March 1848, while fighting at the barricades against the Prussian troops of King Frederick William IV. When press censorship was abolished the same month, an 'Extra Edition of Joy' was published in Berlin: "Of all the rights the fulfillment of which has become ours and for which we hoped, liberated thought is the noblest, for it is the prerequisite of all that is to come." In the course of the conservative counter-revolution, however, after democratic newspapers were banned and printers closed in November 1848, the  qualified its progressive stance and had to deal with criticism and ridicule because of it.

In the mid-nineteenth century the newspaper was still the market and opinion leader in Berlin, but over the next decades it lost this position. Frequent differences among the shareholders blocked its technical and journalistic development. Towards the end of the 19th century, the  maintained a solid position in the Berlin newspaper market but fell far short of the circulation of the new mass-circulation papers from the Ullstein, Scherl and Mosse publishing houses.

The paper's ownership structure had become more complicated; the company shares now belonged to various members of the Lessing and Müller families and were later partly taken over by the newspaper entrepreneurs Rudolf Mosse and August Huck. Through 1910 the paper retained the name ; the previous main title (Royal Privileged Berlin Newspaper of State and Learned Matters) remained only as a subhead.

With the collapse of the German Empire on 9 November, 1918, two days before the official end of World War I, the reference to royal privilege in the newspaper's title became irrelevant.  It was dropped and the newspaper took on its final title:  (Voss's Newspaper: Berlin Newspaper of State and Learned Matters). The papers of the Ullstein publishing house spoke out in favor of the republic; in mid-November an editorial in the  called for the rapid convening of a representative national assembly.

During the Weimar Republic, the newspaper was considered a voice for democratic and liberal forces. It also provided a platform for liberally oriented Russian emigrants. The newspaper published a long obituary on its front page for Vladimir Dmitrievich Nabokov, an opponent of the tsar who was murdered by tsarists in Berlin in 1922. It also published the German translation of the novel 'King, Queen, Knave' by Nabokov's son Vladimir Nabokov.

Although the  had an extensive news section and a qualified staff, its circulation never exceeded 75,000 copies. Between 1914 and 1933, it is said to have incurred a loss of around 30 million gold marks.

Forced end 
Numerous unpopular journalists, among them many Jews, were expelled from their positions. A few weeks later, the Ullstein publishing house, including the newspapers it still published at the time, was Aryanized and taken over by the Franz Eher Verlag, the publishing house of the Nazi Party. When the National Socialist  (editor law) came into force on 1 January 1934, Nazification of the German press was enforced, and publishers lost their influence on reporting and on the composition of editorial offices. On 24 March 1934, in a short note on the front page of the  – "To the Readers of the " – the publisher stated:"In our opinion, the task of publishing a paper of the style of the  has come to an end. No effort was made to revive the paper after the fall of Nazi Germany in 1945.

Prominent contributors 
From 1751 to 1755, Gotthold Ephraim Lessing served as critic. Voss entrusted him with the editorship of the ‘Scholarly Article' and for nine months in 1751 Lessing also provided the monthly supplement 'Latest from the World of Wit'. The writer and novelist Willibald Alexis was an occasional contributor to the paper and supported it in its fight for freedom of the press in the run-up to the German revolutions of 1848–1849. The historian Johann David Erdmann Preuß, who was a friend of novelist Theodor Fontane, made several contributions between 1860 and 1865 to the history of Frederick the Great and his court. His sometime colleague and successor was the writer Paul Schlenther.

Hermann Bachmann, who joined the editorial staff in 1892, was deputy to editor-in-chief Friedrich Stephany from 1895 and became editor-in-chief in 1900.  From 1914 he shared the editorship with Ullstein Publishing director Georg Bernhard, who had a strong influence on the newspaper but did not succeed Bachmann until 1920. He was editor-in-chief until 1930.

From 1911 to 1914, Doris Wittner was responsible for the newspaper's women's supplement. The most important columnist between 1887 and 1918 was Isidor Levy. In the 1920s, Richard Lewinsohn, also a contributor to the weekly Weltbühne under the pseudonym Morus, headed the business editorial department, and Monty (Montague) Jacobs became known as a feature writer and theater critic. Paul Schlesinger wrote his exemplary court reports under the nickname 'Sling' between 1921 and 1928, founding a new journalistic genre.

References

External links
 

German-language newspapers
Defunct newspapers published in Germany
Newspapers published in Berlin
Publications established in 1721
Publications disestablished in 1934
1934 disestablishments in Germany
1721 establishments in Prussia